Émile Gustave Écuyer (18 April 1881 – 8 July 1952) was a French discus thrower. He competed at the 1920 Summer Olympics and placed 14th, and also served as the Olympic flag bearer for France.

References

1881 births
1952 deaths
French male discus throwers
Athletes (track and field) at the 1920 Summer Olympics
Olympic athletes of France
Sportspeople from Ain